Neighbourhood Threat is the first album released by the heavy metal band Johnny Crash, released in 1990. Recorded at Ocean Way Studios, Los Angeles and mixed at Battery Studios, London. The album features guest appearances by Kingdom Come members Danny Stag and Johnny B. Frank.

The title is no doubt taken from the song recorded by first by Iggy Pop and later covered by David Bowie of the same name, "Neighborhood Threat".

After this album, August Worchell was replaced by J.J. Bolt and Stephen Adamo was replaced by then future and now former Guns N' Roses drummer Matt Sorum, and keyboardist Dizzy Reed joined. All three played on the band's second album Unfinished Business, which was released in 2008, also this is their only album before their split in 1992.

Track listing
 "Hey Kid" – 3:28
 "No Bones About It" – 3:25
 "All the Way in Love" – 3:36
 "Thrill of the Kill" – 4:39
 "Axe to the Wax" – 3:49
 "Sink or Swim" – 3:28
 "Crack of Dawn" – 4:08
 "Freedom Road" – 3:02
 "Halfway to Heaven" – 3:09
 "Trigger Happy" – 4:03
 "Baby's Like a Piano" – 3:32

Additional tracks
A track that did not make the final listing on the album was "Crusin' for a Bruisin", written by Worchell/Wright/Stewart, which was eventually released on a compilation album called Hammer Rocks (CBS Records 466897 2), which also included the track "Hey Kid". An accompanying video was also released which featured the promo for "Hey Kid".

Personnel
Vicki James Wright – lead vocals
August Worchell – lead guitar, slide guitar, vocals
Christopher Stewart – rhythm guitar, vocals
Andy Rodgers – bass
Stephen Adamo – drums
Cover Artwork by Barry Jackson

1990 debut albums
Johnny Crash (band) albums